This list is for trademarks of corporations and organizations which feature an actual or stylised Native American figure.
Calumet Baking Powder Company
Crazy Horse Beer
Land O'Lakes
Jacob Leinenkugel Brewing Company  
Lorillard Tobacco Company
Mutual of Omaha
Natural American Spirits
Pontiac
Spur Steak Ranches

Sports teams

Washington Redskins
Cleveland Indians (Chief Wahoo)
University of Illinois at Urbana–Champaign (Chief Illiniwek)
Chicago Blackhawks
Atlanta Braves (Chief Noc-A-Homa)
Frölunda HC
Portland Winter Hawks
Elora Mohawks
Exeter Chiefs
Florida State Seminoles
Armijo High School
North Dakota Fighting Sioux

References

Native Americans in popular culture
Native Americans